Ahlisadar is one of the largest villages in Fatehabad district,  Haryana, India. It is situated 6 kilometers (3.7 miles) from National Highway 9 and ha s the most fertile agricultural land in the state, producing mainly rice. The village is known for the number of non-resident Indians, with almost every family having a NRI citizen among its members.

Landmarks
The village has five Sikh and two Hindu temples.

Sikh temples
Baba Bagh singh ji
Baba Bhana singh ji
Baba Nahar singh ji beer
Vada Gurudwara sahib 
Baba Bhuman ShaHA ji gurudwara

Hindu temples
Baba Vishvkarma mandir (at bus stand Ahlisadar)
Shri Shiv mandir (near Thakur town)
Mata sherawali temple

Villages in Fatehabad district